The United States House of Representatives elections in California, 1942 was an election for California's delegation to the United States House of Representatives, which occurred as part of the general election of the House of Representatives on November 3, 1942. California gained three districts as a result of the 1940 Census, two of which were won by Democrats and one by Republicans. Of California's existing seats, Democrats and Republicans each swapped one district.

Overview

Delegation composition

Results
Final results from the Clerk of the House of Representatives:

District 1

District 2

District 3

District 4

District 5

District 6

District 7

District 8

District 9

District 10

District 11

District 12

District 13

District 14

District 15

District 16

District 17

District 18

District 19

District 20

District 21

District 22

District 23

See also
78th United States Congress
Political party strength in California
Political party strength in U.S. states
1942 United States House of Representatives elections

References
California Elections Page
Office of the Clerk of the House of Representatives

External links
California Legislative District Maps (1911-Present)
RAND California Election Returns: District Definitions

1942
California
United States House of Representatives